Charlotte Jacobs (13 February 1847, Sappemeer - 31 October 1916, The Hague), was a Dutch feminist and pharmacist. She was the first of her gender in the Netherlands with a degree in pharmacology and also active within the women's movement. She was the sister of Aletta Jacobs.

Charlotte Jacobs became the second female university student in the Netherlands when she started her studies in Amsterdam in 1877 and the first female pharmacist in 1879. She was a pharmacist at the Utrecht hospital in 1882–84. 

In 1887–1912, she managed her own pharmacy in Batavia in the Dutch East Indies, and was as such the first female pharmacist in the Dutch East Indies. 

In 1908, she founded the first women's movement "Vereeniging voor Vrouwenkiesrecht" in the Dutch East Indies. She primarily fought for education opportunities for women in the colony, and not only for the Dutch women. She returned to the Netherlands in 1912, where she was active within woman suffrage and the peace movement.

References

1847 births
1916 deaths
Dutch pharmacists
Dutch suffragists
People from Hoogezand-Sappemeer
19th-century Dutch East Indies people
University of Groningen alumni
20th-century Dutch East Indies people
Women pharmacists
20th-century Dutch women